Nogaro (Gascon: Nogaròu) is a commune in the Gers department, Southwestern France.  It is the site of a distillery of Armagnac brandy.

Geography

The commune is bordered by six other communes: Caupenne-d'Armagnac to the northwest, Sainte-Christie-d'Armagnac to the northeast, Loubédat to the east]], Sion to the southeast, Urgosse to the south, and finally by Arblade-le-Haut to the west.

Population

Facilities 
Nogaro is the site of Circuit Paul Armagnac, a motorsport race track, and the neighbouring Nogaro Aerodrome.

Notable people 
The historian and palaeographer Charles Samaran (1879–1982) died in Nogaro.

The chef and television host Michel Sarran was born in Nogaro.

The tennis player Tessah Andrianjafitrimo has lived in Nogaro since 2010.

See also
Communes of the Gers department

References

Communes of Gers
Armagnac